Philipp Pomer (born 12 August 1997) is an Austrian professional footballer who plays as a winger for Ried.

Career
Pomer is a product of the youth academie of Favoritner and Austria Wien. He began his senior career with Favoritner, before moving to Elektra Wien in 2015. In 2016, he transferred to Ebreichsdorf. In the 2018-19 season, he scored 17 goals in 25 games with Ebreichsdorf, earning him a move to the 2. Liga with Blau-Weiß Linz on 29 May 2019. On 25 May 2021, he transferred to the Austrian Football Bundesliga club Ried, signing a contract until 2023.

References

External links
 
 OEFB Profile

1997 births
Living people
Footballers from Vienna
Austrian footballers
Favoritner AC players
FC Blau-Weiß Linz players
SV Ried players
Austrian Football Bundesliga players
2. Liga (Austria) players
Austrian Regionalliga players
Association football wingers
Austrian people of Spanish descent